Richard Symsyk (25 April 1944 – December 2004) was a Canadian rower. He competed at the 1968 Summer Olympics and the 1972 Summer Olympics.

References

1944 births
2004 deaths
Canadian male rowers
Olympic rowers of Canada
Rowers at the 1968 Summer Olympics
Rowers at the 1972 Summer Olympics
People from Summerside, Prince Edward Island
Rowers from St. Catharines
Sportspeople from Prince Edward Island